Thalassema antarcticum  is a species of marine echiuran worm. This species is different from others in its genus that also have continuous longitudinal muscles by its lack of papillae on the body.

References

Echiurans